The 2010 Judo Grand Slam Moscow was held in Moscow, Russia, from 3 to 4 July 2010.

Medal summary

Men's events

Women's events

Source Results

Medal table

References

External links
 

2010 IJF World Tour
2010 Judo Grand Slam
Judo
Judo competitions in Russia
Judo
Judo